Rancho Banquete is a census-designated place (CDP) in Nueces County, Texas, United States. The population was 424 at the 2010 census, down from 469 at the 2000 census.

Geography
Rancho Banquete is located at  (27.810720, -97.834404).

Demographics
As of the census of 2000, there were 469 people, 118 households, and 111 families residing in the CDP. The population density was 164.6 people per square mile (63.5/km2). There were 128 housing units at an average density of 44.9/sq mi (17.3/km2). The racial makeup of the CDP was 71.64% White, 0.64% African American, 1.28% Native American, 0.64% Asian, 23.67% from other races, and 2.13% from two or more races. Hispanic or Latino of any race were 92.96% of the population.

There were 118 households, out of which 53.4% had children under the age of 18 living with them, 76.3% were married couples living together, 10.2% had a female householder with no husband present, and 5.9% were non-families. 5.9% of all households were made up of individuals, and 2.5% had someone living alone who was 65 years of age or older. The average household size was 3.97 and the average family size was 4.07.

In the CDP, the population was spread out, with 38.0% under the age of 18, 12.4% from 18 to 24, 27.9% from 25 to 44, 17.1% from 45 to 64, and 4.7% who were 65 years of age or older. The median age was 25 years. For every 100 females, there were 88.4 males. For every 100 females age 18 and over, there were 92.7 males.

The median income for a household in the CDP was $22,679, and the median income for a family was $22,679. Males had a median income of $20,625 versus $14,091 for females. The per capita income for the CDP was $7,739. About 29.1% of families and 31.7% of the population were below the poverty line, including 46.7% of those under age 18 and 100.0% of those age 65 or over.

Education
It is divided between the Agua Dulce Independent School District and the Banquete Independent School District.

References

Census-designated places in Nueces County, Texas
Census-designated places in Texas
Corpus Christi metropolitan area